Zin Min Tun (born 12 June 1993) is a footballer from Burma. He plays for Shan United  and also a member of Myanmar national football team. He made his national team debut on 30 March 2015 against Indonesia.

Honours

Club
Shan United 
Myanmar National League
Winners (2): 2017, 2019
Runners-up (1): 2018
General Aung San Shield
Champions (1): 2017
Runners-up (1): 2019

References

1993 births
Living people
Burmese footballers
Myanmar international footballers
Association football forwards
Yadanarbon F.C. players
People from Mandalay Region
Competitors at the 2019 Southeast Asian Games
Southeast Asian Games medalists in football
Southeast Asian Games bronze medalists for Myanmar